Little Rocky Mountain is a mountain located in the Catskill Mountains of New York east-southeast of Lanesville. Plateau Mountain is located north, and Olderbark Mountain is located west of Little Rocky Mountain.

References

Mountains of Greene County, New York
Mountains of New York (state)